Green Street is a street in New London, Connecticut. It was laid out in 1787 principally through the land of Timothy Green in Downtown New London and is located off State Street and retains its original length and width with a number of buildings within arm's reach of each other. Green Street is intersected by Golden Street (laid out in 1782)  and Green's Alley (laid out 1786) as Cross Street. 

Of the existing "ancient" structures in this area listed in as part of the Downtown New London Historic District is the 1st Richard Douglass House located at 102 Golden Street, the 1801 Richard Douglass House on Green Street, The 1740s "Mistress House" next to the Richard Douglass House and on neighboring Green's Alley the 1789 Reverend West House.

After the burning of New London in 1781 by British and Tory forces as part of the Battle of Groton Heights by Gen. Benedict Arnold, Green Street was laid out and contained many houses and small businesses including a bakery, cooperage, and more. Several churches also surrounded the neighborhood. 

In the early 20th century, Green Street was the home of several artists and actors as well as those that worked in many of the local theatres (Capitol, Lyceum). The first organizing of the Methodist Church happened at the home of Richard Douglass on Green Street in 1793

References

Geography of New London County, Connecticut
Streets in Connecticut
Transportation in New London County, Connecticut